125 Magazine is a London, England, based publication for work and ideas by photographers, illustrators and artists around the world.

Background
125 Magazines founding partners and the core editorial team are photographers Perry Curties and Jason Joyce, and art directors Rob Crane and Martin Yates who started 125 in 2003 after the realization that no unbiased platform for new work by both established and emerging talent existed. The first issue (themed Fashion) was released in the UK and received a nomination in the Magazine Design Awards but was not a commercial success. The magazine is now a 300-page, 2 kg 'gallery' of new work and ideas by photographers, stylists and illustrators around the world.

Print sales
125 has a print-sales service which makes all the photography in the magazine available as limited edition art prints through its website. Inclusion in the service is not compulsory but all contributors are offered the chance to participate, with income divided equally between photographer and 125. According to the 125 website they have sold in excess of 8000 prints online and through exhibitions with companies and galleries including Paul Smith and St. Lukes advertising agency.

Contributors
Each issue has a theme and contains the work of 20-25 contributors as well as interviews with creative talents such as Nick Knight, Glen Luchford, Sean Ellis, Don McCullin Rankin (photographer), and Magnum Photos.

High-profile names have been commissioned to shoot for 125, such as Rankin, Richard Kern, Perou, Christopher Griffith, Alice Hawkins, Mick Rock, Shinichi Maruyama, Ernst Fischer, and Tim Simmons.

Influences and competitors
The 125 founders have cited I-D, and particularly Rankin's Rank Magazine which was a short-lived independent showcase as proof that such a magazine was a viable proposition. In 2003 Tank, Exit and Big Magazine were the closest rivals to 125.

References

External links
 125 Magazine official website
 125/Paul Smith Collaboration
 Colophon, Luxemourg

2003 establishments in the United Kingdom
Biannual magazines published in the United Kingdom
Visual arts magazines published in the United Kingdom
Photography magazines
Magazines established in 2003
Magazines published in London